Cathaemacta is a genus of moths in the family Geometridae.

Species
 Cathaemacta loxomochla Turner, 1929
 Cathaemacta thermistis (Lower, 1894)

References
 Cathaemacta at Markku Savela's Lepidoptera and Some Other Life Forms
 Natural History Museum Lepidoptera genus database

Oenochrominae